John Thomas Hawley (June 16, 1920 – December 20, 1999) was an attorney and Republican politician from  Idaho. Hawley was the 1962  nominee for the United States Senate seat, winning the June primary over  but was defeated by Democratic incumbent Frank Church 

Prior to his Senate run, Hawley served in the state legislature as a one-term member of the Idaho House  He was also the First Assistant U.S. Attorney for Idaho, a graduate of the University of Idaho in Moscow, a World War II combat veteran, and the grandson of Gov. James H. Hawley.

Hawley graduated high school from St. Teresa's Academy in Boise, attended the College of Idaho in Caldwell, and was a member of Beta Theta Pi 

After a battle with leukemia, Hawley died at age 79 in 1999 at his home

Election result

References

1920 births
1999 deaths
Idaho lawyers
Republican Party members of the Idaho House of Representatives
20th-century American lawyers
20th-century American politicians
University of Idaho alumni
American military personnel of World War II
Deaths from leukemia
Deaths from cancer in Idaho